The LPGA Mediheal Championship is a women's professional golf tournament in California on the LPGA Tour. A new event in 2018, it was held at Lake Merced Golf Club in Daly City, an adjacent suburb south of San Francisco. The course hosted the Swinging Skirts LPGA Classic for three years 2014–2016). In 2022, the event moved to The Saticoy Club in Somis and will now be played in October instead of May.

Lydia Ko won the first edition in a playoff over Minjee Lee; on the first extra hole, Ko made a short eagle putt after Lee had birdied.

Winners

Tournament records

References

External links

Coverage on the LPGA Tour's official site

LPGA Tour events
Golf in California
Recurring sporting events established in 2018
2018 establishments in California
Women's sports in California